Strawberry Hill, also known as Area 13, is a neighborhood in Cambridge, Massachusetts. It is bounded by the town of Belmont on the west, Watertown on the south, Aberdeen Avenue on the east, and Fresh Pond on the north. In 2017 it had a population of 2,585 residents living in 1,061 households, and the average household income was $74,107. The altitude is around 114 feet above sea level making it the highest natural altitude in Cambridge.

References
Cambridge Police Department

Neighborhoods in Cambridge, Massachusetts